Pristiophorus striatus is an extinct species of sawshark in the genus Pristiophorus. It existed in what is now Slovakia during the Miocene epoch, and was described by Charlie J. Underwood and Jan Schlogl in 2012.

References

Pristiophoridae
Miocene sharks
Extinct animals of Europe
Fossil taxa described in 2012